Houston County is a county in the U.S. state of Minnesota. At the 2020 census, the population was 18,843. Its county seat is Caledonia.

Houston County is included in the La Crosse–Onalaska metropolitan statistical area.

History
The area covered by today's Houston County was first organized as St. Croix County, of the Wisconsin Territory, in 1839. On October 27, 1849, part of that county was partitioned off to create Wabashaw County of the Minnesota Territory. On February 23, 1854, the territorial legislature authorized the partitioning of sections of Wabashaw to create Fillmore County and Houston County. An election on April 4, 1854, allowed the county government to be completed. The county was named for Sam Houston, who had been president of the Republic of Texas and a US senator from Texas. The village of Houston was the first county seat. Then a land speculator made an effort to move the seat to Caledonia, and in 1855 the county board moved the county records to Caledonia, which became the de facto seat, and eventually the legal seat after several county votes. In 1855 the records were stored in the cabin of Commissioner Samuel McPhail; the first court hearings were held in that cabin, and a one-story courthouse and jail was built in Caledonia in 1857. A two-story building was built in Caledonia in 1867, and several referendums made Caledonia the county seat by 1874. From that point on, Caledonia prospered and Houston slowly declined. The only other area of prominence was La Crescent, which benefited from its connection to La Crosse, Wisconsin.

Geography
Houston County is at Minnesota's southeast corner. Its eastern border abuts Wisconsin (across the Mississippi River) and its southern border abuts Iowa. The Mississippi flows south-southeast along its eastern border. The Root River flows east through the northern part of the county, discharging into the Mississippi. Pine Creek flows east-southeast through the northeastern part of the county to discharge into the Mississippi, while Crooked Creek flows east across the southern part of the county to discharge into the Mississippi. The county's terrain consists of low rolling hills on its western end, transitioning to hills carved with drainages toward the east. The central and western portion of the county is a plateau with its highest point at 1,273' (388m) ASL, near its southwest corner.

The county is in the Driftless Zone, marked by the absence of glacial drift and presence of bedrock cut by streams into steep hills. The plateau that surrounds Caledonia includes flat, fertile farm land and hilly, verdant pasture land.

Lakes
The Upper Mississippi River National Wildlife and Fish Refuge runs along the county's eastern border. Four lakes in the refuge fall within the county:

 Blue Lake
 Hayshore Lake
 Lawrence Lake
 Target Lake

Adjacent counties

 Winona County - north
 La Crosse County, Wisconsin - northeast
 Vernon County, Wisconsin - east
 Allamakee County, Iowa - south
 Winneshiek County, Iowa - southwest
 Fillmore County - west

Protected areas
 Beaver Creek Valley State Park
 Mound Prairie Scientific and Natural Area
 Upper Mississippi River National Wildlife and Fish Refuge (part)

Demographics

2000 census
At the 2000 census, there were 19,718 people, 7,633 households and 5,411 families in the county. The population density was 35.7/sqmi (13.8/km2). There were 8,168 housing units at an average density of 14.8/sqmi (5.71/km2). The racial makeup of the county was 98.47% White, 0.31% Black or African American, 0.18% Native American, 0.37% Asian, 0.02% Pacific Islander, 0.14% from other races, and 0.51% from two or more races. 0.61% of the population were Hispanic or Latino of any race. 43.1% were of German, 29.6% Norwegian and 7.5% Irish ancestry.

There were 7,633 households, of which 34.4% had children under the age of 18 living with them, 60.0% were married couples living together, 7.4% had a female householder with no husband present, and 29.1% were non-families. 25.4% of all households were made up of individuals, and 12.0% had someone living alone who was 65 years of age or older. The average household size was 2.53 and the average family size was 3.05.

The county population contained 27.2% under the age of 18, 6.8% from 18 to 24, 26.8% from 25 to 44, 23.1% from 45 to 64, and 16.0% who were 65 years of age or older. The median age was 39 years. For every 100 females there were 97.5 males. For every 100 females age 18 and over, there were 95.1 males.

The median household income was $40,680 and the median family income was $49,196. Males had a median income of $32,557 and females $22,158. The per capita income was $18,826. About 4.2% of families and 6.5% of the population were below the poverty line, including 6.4% of those under age 18 and 11.2% of those age 65 or over.

2020 Census

Transportation

Major highways

  U.S. Highway 14
  U.S. Highway 61
  Minnesota State Highway 16
  Minnesota State Highway 26
  Minnesota State Highway 44
  Minnesota State Highway 76

Airport
 Houston County Airport

Communities

Cities

 Brownsville
 Caledonia (county seat)
 Eitzen
 Hokah
 Houston
 La Crescent (partly in Winona County)
 Spring Grove

Unincorporated communities

 Bee
 Black Hammer
 Freeburg
 Jefferson
 Mayville
 Money Creek
 Newhouse
 Pine Creek (partial)
 Reno
 River Junction
 Willington Grove
 Wilmington
 Yucatan

Sheldon

Townships

 Black Hammer Township
 Brownsville Township
 Caledonia Township
 Crooked Creek Township
 Hokah Township
 Houston Township
 Jefferson Township
 La Crescent Township
 Mayville Township
 Money Creek Township
 Mound Prairie Township
 Sheldon Township
 Spring Grove Township
 Union Township
 Wilmington Township
 Winnebago Township
 Yucatan Township

Government and politics
Houston County voters have tended to vote Republican in the past few decades. As of 2020 the county had selected the Republican candidate in 67% of presidential elections since 1980.

Education
School districts include:
 Caledonia Public School District
 Houston Public School District
 La Crescent-Hokah School District
 Mabel-Canton Public School District
 Rushford-Peterson Public Schools
 Spring Grove School District

See also
 National Register of Historic Places listings in Houston County, Minnesota
 Upper Mississippi River National Wildlife and Fish Refuge

References

 History of Houston County (1919)

External links

 Houston County
 Houston County Health and Demographic Data

 
Minnesota counties
Minnesota counties on the Mississippi River
1854 establishments in Minnesota Territory
Populated places established in 1854
Sam Houston